Poveri ma ricchi is a 2016 Italian comedy film directed by Fausto Brizzi.

The film is a loose remake of the 2011 French film Les Tuche. A sequel entitled Poveri ma ricchissimi was released in December 2017.

Cast

References

External links

2016 films
Films directed by Fausto Brizzi
2010s Italian-language films
2016 comedy films
Italian comedy films
Italian remakes of French films
2010s Italian films